The 1993 Athens International was a men's tennis tournament played on outdoor clay courts in Athens, Greece that was part of the World Series of the 1993 ATP Tour. It was the 8th edition of the tournament and was held from 4 October until 11 October 1993. Unseeded Jordi Arrese won his second consecutive singles title at the event.

Finals

Singles

 Jordi Arrese defeated  Alberto Berasategui 6–4, 3–6, 6–3
 It was Arrese's only title of the year and the 9th of his career.

Doubles

 Horacio de la Peña /  Jorge Lozano defeated  Royce Deppe /  John Sullivan 3–6, 6–1, 6–2
 It was de la Peña's 2nd title of the year and the 10th of his career. It was Lozano's only title of the year and the 9th of his career.

References

External links
 ITF tournament edition details

Athens International
ATP Athens Open
Athens International
October 1993 sports events in Europe